Tomasz Łapiński (born 1 August 1969 in Łapy) is a retired Polish football player.

Career
He made 36 appearances for the Poland national team.
Łapiński was a participant at the 1992 Summer Olympics, where Poland won the silver medal.

References

External links
 

1969 births
Living people
People from Łapy
Polish footballers
Olympic footballers of Poland
Olympic silver medalists for Poland
Legia Warsaw players
Widzew Łódź players
Footballers at the 1992 Summer Olympics
Ekstraklasa players
Olympic medalists in football
Sportspeople from Podlaskie Voivodeship
Medalists at the 1992 Summer Olympics
Association football defenders
Poland international footballers